Prawn curry may refer to:

 Shrimp curry
 Chingri malai curry, type of prawn curry
 Chingudi Jhola. spicy gravy based prawn curry
 Daab Chingri, type of prawn curry, cooked and served in coconut